Rudolph or Rudolf (Italian, Portuguese and ) or Rodolphe is a male first name, and, less commonly, a surname. It is an ancient Germanic name deriving from two stems: Hrōþi, Hruod, Hróðr or Hrōð, meaning "fame", "glory" "honour", "renown", and olf meaning "wolf"(Hrōþiwulfaz).

In other languages 
Afrikaans: Roelof, Rudolf
Albanian: Rudolf

Armenian: Ռուդոլֆ (Rudolf)
Catalan: Rodolf
Croatian: Rudolf
Czech: Rudolf
Danish: Rudolf
Dutch: Roelof, Rudolf, Ruud
English: Rudolph, Rodolph, Rolph
Estonian: Rudo, Ruudo, Ruudolf
Finnish: Ruuto, Ruutolffi
Flemish: Roel
French: Rodolphe, Raoul
Georgian: რუდოლფ (Rudolp)
German: Rudolf, Rolf, diminutive: Rudi
Greek: Ροδόλφος (Rhodólphos), Ράλλης (Rhálles)
Hebrew: רודולף (Rudolf)
Hungarian: Rudolf
Italian: Rodolfo
Japanese:ルドルフ (Rudorufu), ルド (Rudo), ルディ (Rudi)
Latin: Rudolphus
Latvian: Rūdolfs, Rūdis
Lithuanian: Rudolfas, Rudas
Manx: Roolwer
Norwegian: Rudolf
Polish: Rudolf
Portuguese: Rodolfo
Russian:  Рудольф (Rudolf)
Serbian: Rudolf (Рудолф)
Slovak: Rudolf
Slovene: Rudolf
Spanish: Rodolfo
Swedish: Rudolf

Given name

Royalty and nobility 
Rudolph, Count of Ponthieu (died 866)
Rudolph II of Burgundy (880–937)
Rudolph of France (c. 890–936), reigned 923–936
Rudolf of Rheinfelden (1025–1080), Duke of Swabia
Rudolph II, Count of Habsburg (died 1232)
Rudolf I of Germany (1218–1291)
Rudolf II, Duke of Austria (1270–1290)
Rudolph I of Bohemia (1281–1307)
Rudolf II, Count Palatine of the Rhine (1306–1353)
Rudolph, Duke of Lorraine (1320–1346)
Rudolf IV, Duke of Austria (1339–1365)
Rudolph II, Holy Roman Emperor (1552–1612)
Rudolf, Crown Prince of Austria (1858–1889), son and heir of Emperor Franz Joseph I of Austria and Empress Elisabeth of Austria (died at Mayerling)

Religious figures 
Rudolf of Fulda, 9th-century monk, writer and theologian
Rudolf von Habsburg-Lothringen (1788–1831), Archbishop of Olomouc and member of the House of Habsburg-Lorraine
Rudolf Baláž (1940–2011). Slovak Bishop of the Roman Catholic Diocese of Banská Bystrica from 1990 until his death in 2011
Rudolph Grossman (1867–1927), Austrian-American rabbi

Wartime figures and military leaders 
Rudolf Freiherr Stöger-Steiner von Steinstätten, Colonel-General in the Austro-Hungarian army, the last Imperial Minister for War to the Austro-Hungarian Empire during World War I
Rudolph Lambart, 10th Earl of Cavan, British Army officer and Chief of the Imperial General Staff
Rodolfo Graziani, prominent Italian military officer in the Kingdom of Italy's Regio Esercito (Royal Army) and the Minister of National Defence of the Italian Social Republic
Rudolph B. Davila, United States Army officer who received the Medal of Honor for his heroic actions in the European theatre during World War II
Rudolph Bierwirth, General officer in the Australian Army
Rudolf Anderson (1927–1962), U.S. Air Force pilot and first recipient of the Air Force Cross
Rudolf von Bünau, German general in the Wehrmacht during World War II and one of the chief commanders of Vienna Offensive
Rudolf von Brudermann, general of Austria-Hungary during the First World War who led the Austro-Hungarian 3rd army during the Battle of Galicia
Karl Rudolf Gerd von Rundstedt, German field marshal in the Wehrmacht of Nazi Germany
Rudolf Berthold (1891–1920), German World War I air ace
Rudolph Douglas Raiford, American World War II combat officer
Rudolf Christoph Freiherr von Gersdorff, German army officer who attempted to assassinate Adolf Hitler by suicide bombing on 21 March 1943, leader of the unit, soldiers of which discovered the mass graves of the Soviet-perpetrated Katyn massacre
 Rudolf Schmundt, German officer in the Wehrmacht and adjutant to Adolf Hitler during World War II, later tried to unsuccessfully assassinate Hitler
Rudolf Viest, Slovak military leader, commander of the 1st Czechoslovak army during the Slovak National Uprising
Rudolf Frank, German Luftwaffe military aviator and night fighter ace during World War II 
Rudolf von Eschwege, German World War I flying ace who was the German Empire's only fighter pilot operating on the Macedonian Front
Rudolf Veiel, German Panzer general during World War II, one of the principal commanders of Battle of Greece
Rudolf Sieckenius, German Generalmajor during World War II, one of the principal commanders of Battle of Berlin
Rudolf von Slatin, Anglo-Austrian soldier and administrator in Sudan
Rudolf Jordan, Nazi Gauleiter in Halle-Merseburg and Magdeburg-Anhalt
Hans-Rudolf Rösing, German U-boat commander in World War II 
Rudolph Hiemstra, South African Air Force commander
Rudolf Schmidt, general in the Wehrmacht of Nazi Germany during World War II
Rodolfo P. Hernández, United States Army soldier
Rudolf Perešin, Croatian fighter pilot serving in the Yugoslav Air Force (JRZ) during Croatian War of Independence
Rudolf Toussaint, German army officer, one of the principal commanders of Prague uprising
Rudolf Meister, German general in the Luftwaffe during World War II
Rudolf Maister (1874–1934) Slovene military officer, poet and political activist, one of the leading perpetrators of Marburg's Bloody Sunday, one of the principal commanders of Austro-Slovene conflict in Carinthia

Nazis
Rudolf Diels, German Nazi SS official and Director of German secret police Gestapo from 1933 to 1934
Rudolf Brandt (1909–1948), German Nazi SS officer and leader of the Jewish skull collection project
Rudolf Hess (1894–1987), Deputy Führer in Nazi Germany, one of the leaders of Beer Hall Putsch, best known for his solo flight to Scotland
Rudolf Höss (1900–1947), German Nazi first commandant of Auschwitz concentration camp
 Rudolf Lange, Nazi German SS officer and one of the major perpetrators of the Holocaust, commander of Salaspils concentration camp, one of the leading perpetrators of Jelgava massacre and Rumbula massacre
Rudolf Spanner, Director of the Danzig Anatomical Institute during World War II who set up a process to produce soap made from human corpses
Rudolf Rahn, Nazi German politician and Plenipotentiary to the Italian Social Republic

Multi-fields
Rudolf Steiner, Austrian philosopher, social reformer, architect, and esotericist

Literature
Rudolf G. Binding, German writer and supporter of Hitler
Rudolph Blaumanis, Latvian writer, journalist and playwright, considered one of the greatest writers in Latvian history and particularly a master of realism
Rudolf Fischer, German writer
Rudolph Löwenstein, German writer

Movie industry 
Rudolph Anders, American actor
Rudolph Sternad, American art director and production designer
Rudolf Buitendach, South African born film director and editor
Rudolph Cartier, Austrian television director, filmmaker, screenwriter and producer who worked predominantly in British television, exclusively for the BBC
Rudolf Carl, Austrian actor
Rudolf Christians, German actor
Rodolfo "Rudy" Mancuso, American actor, Internet personality and musician most notable for his comedic videos on YouTube and previously on Vine
Rudolf Martin, German actor working mainly in the United States
Rudolph Mate, Polish-Hungarian-American cinematographer, film director and film producer
Rudolf "Ruud" Kleinpaste, Dutch-New Zealand naturalist and TV host
Rudolph Schildkraut, Austrian film and theatre actor
Rudolf Ising, member of the American animation team Harman and Ising, known for founding the Warner Bros. and Metro-Goldwyn-Mayer animation studios and creating the Looney Tunes
Rudolf Jugert, German film director
Rudolf Platte, German actor
Rudolf Prack, Austrian actor
Rudolph Valentino (1895–1926), Italian silent film actor
Rudolph Walker (born 1939), British actor
Rudolf Noelte, German film director, theater director and opera director
Rudy Wurlitzer (born 1937), American novelist and screenwriter
Rudolf Bernhard (1901–1962), Swiss actor and theater director
Rudolf Meinert, Austrian screenwriter, film producer and director
Rudolf Hrušínský (1920–1994), Czech actor
Rudolf Zehetgruber, Austrian film director, producer, screenwriter and actor 
Ruedi Walter (1916–1990), Swiss comedian and actor

In science and technology 
Ralph H. Baer (Rudolf Heinrich Baer) (1922–2014), German-American video game pioneer, inventor, engineer
Rudolf Rudy Ballieux (1930–2020), Dutch immunologist
Rudolph Boysen (1895–1950), American horticulturist, creator of the boysenberry
Rudolf Clausius, German physicist and mathematician
Rudolf Diesel (1858–1913), German inventor of the diesel engine
Rudolf Hauschka (1891–1969), Austrian chemist, author, inventor, entrepreneur and anthroposophist
Rudolf Leuckart (1822–1898), German zoologist
Rudolf Fleischmann (1903–2002), German experimental nuclear physicist 
Rudolf Kochendörffer (1911–1980), German mathematician
Rudolf E. Kálmán (1930–2016), Hungarian-born American electrical engineer, mathematician, and inventor of the Kalman filter
Rudolf Jaenisch (born 1942), German biologist, Professor of Biology at MIT and a founding member of the Whitehead Institute for Biomedical Research
Rudolf Ernst Brünnow (1858–1917), German-American orientalist and philologist
Rudolph John Anderson (1879–1961), American biochemist
Rudolph A. Marcus (born 1923), Canadian Nobel Prize-winning chemist
Rudolf Robert Maier (1824–1888), German pathologist 
Rudolf Simek (born 1954), Austrian Germanist and philologian
Rudolf Jakob Camerarius (1665–1721), German botanist
Rudolf Virchow (1821–1902), German physician and biologist
Rudolf Wolf (1816–1893), Swiss astronomer and mathematician
Rudolf Peierls (1907–1995), British physicist
Rudolf Wagner (1805–1864), German anatomist and physiologist and the discoverer of the germinal vesicle

Musicians 
Rudolph Isley, American singer-songwriter and one of the founding members of The Isley Brothers
Rudolf Friml, American composer and pianist
Rudolf Baumgartner, Swiss conductor and violinist
Rudolf Bing (1902–1997), Austrian-American opera impresario
:fr:Rodolphe Burger, French composer
Rudolf Friml (1879–1972), composer of operettas, musicals songs and piano pieces, and a pianist
Rudolph Ganz, Swiss-born American pianist, conductor, composer, and music educator
Rodolfo "Fito" Páez (born 1963), Argentine singer-songwriter
 Rudolph Isley (born 1939), American singer-songwriter and is one of the founding members of The Isley Brothers
 Rudolf Schenker (born 1948), German guitarist and founding member of heavy metal band Scorpions
Rudolph Lewis, British bass-baritone
Rudolf Fischer, German musician
Wage Rudolf Supratman (1903–1938), Indonesian songwriter, and the composer who wrote both the melodies and lyric of the anthem Indonesia Raya

Political figures
Rudolf Anschober (born 1960), Austrian politician
Rudolf von Auerswald, German official who served as Prime Minister of Prussia during the Revolution of 1848
Rudolph "Rudy" Boschwitz, American politician and former Independent-Republican United States Senator from Minnesota
Rudolf "Rudy" Andeweg, Dutch political scientist
Rudolph Blankenburg, businessman and manufacturer, who became a politician and elected mayor of Philadelphia
Rudolf Buttmann, German politician and diplomat
Rudolph "Rudy" Giuliani (born 1944), American lawyer, businessman, former politician, and public speaker, Mayor of New York City from 1994 to 2001
Rudolf Gnägi, Swiss politician and member of the Swiss Federal Council
Rudolf E. A. Havenstein, German lawyer and president of the Reichsbank (German central bank) during the hyperinflation of 1921–1923
Rudolph K. Hynicka, American politician who led the Republican party in Cincinnati, Ohio
Rudolf Katz, German politician and judge
Rudolph King, American politician who served as member of Massachusetts House of Representatives
Rudolf Kirchschläger, Austrian diplomat, politician and judge, eighth President of Austria
Rudolf Kjellén, Swedish political scientist and politician who first coined the term "geopolitics"
Rudolf Krohne (1876–1953), German jurist and politician 
Rudolf Minger, Swiss politician and member of the Swiss Federal Council
Rudolph "Rudy" Perpich, former governor of Minnesota
Rudolph Jay Schaefer I, president of F. & M. Schaefer Brewing Company
Rudolf Scharping, German politician (SPD) and sports official who served as 12th Minister of Defence of Germany
Rudolf Seiters, German politician of the CDU (Christian Democratic Union) party
Rudolph G. Tenerowicz, American politician from the U.S. state of Michigan
Rudolf "Rudi" Vis, Dutch-born British politician and Member of Parliament

Middle name
Charles Rudolph Walgreen Jr., president of Walgreens and the chairman of the board 
Gerald Rudolph Ford, American politician who served as the 38th president of the United States

Dancers 
Rudolf von Laban (1879–1958), Austrian choreographer
Rudolf Nureyev (1938–1993), Soviet-born dancer

Other 
Rudolf Caracciola, German racing driver
Rudolph Contreras, United States District Judge of the United States District Court for the District of Columbia
Rudolph "Rudy" J. Castellani Jr., American professor of pathology and Director of Neuropathology at the University of Maryland
Rodolph Austin, Jamaican professional footballer
Rudolph B. Davila, United States army officer
Rudolf Bahro, dissident from East Germany
Rudolph Weaver, American architect, university professor and administrator 
Rudolf Dassler, German Businessman known for German Sportswear Company Puma
Rudolf "Rudi" Assauer, German football manager and player
Rudolf Abel, the alias of Vilyam Genrikhovich Fisher (1903–1971), a Russian spy
Rudolf Amelunxen, German politician of the Zentrum and the 1st Minister President of North Rhine-Westphalia 
Rudolf Minkowski, American astronomer
Rudolf Dreikurs, Austrian psychiatrist and educator
Rudolf "Rudi" Dutschke, spokesperson of the 1960s German student movement
Rudolf "Rudi" Fischer, Swiss racing driver
Rodolfo "Corky" Gonzales, Mexican American boxer, poet, and political activist
Rudolph Walton, American merchant after whom was named Rudolph Walton School in Philadelphia
Rudolph A. Peterson, American banker who served as the President and CEO of Bank of America and Administrator of the United Nations Development Programme
Rudolph A. Seiden, American chemist and a Zionist activist
Rudolph Ackermann, Anglo-German bookseller, inventor, lithographer, publisher and businessman
Rodolphe Adada, Congolese politician and diplomat
Rodolfo Acquaviva, Italian Jesuit missionary to India
Rudolph Aggrey, American diplomat who served as the United States Ambassador to Senegal, Gambia, and Romania
Rudolf Smend, German theologian
Rudolph A. Marcus, Canadian-born chemist who received the 1992 Nobel Prize in Chemistry for his contributions to the theory of electron transfer reactions in chemical systems
Rudolf Robert Maier, German pathologist
Rudolph "Bingo" Kampman, Canadian ice hockey defenceman in the NHL
Rudolf Baumbach, German poet
Rudolph A. Herold, American architect
Rudolf "Rudi" Hess, American fine art painter, sculptor and art critic, who was based in Northern California
Rudolph Loewenstein, Polish-born American psychoanalyst
Rudolf Horn, Austrian biathlete and cross-country skier
Rudolf Plyukfelder, Ukrainian weightlifter
Rudolph Hass, American developer of the Hass avocado, the source of 95% of California avocados grown commercially today
Rudolf Fischer, Romanian historian
Rudolf Rocker, German anarchist writer and activist
Rudolf Dassler (1898–1974), German businessman
Rodolphe Saadé (born 1970), French billionaire businessman
Rudolf Schindler, German physician and gastroenterologist
Rudolph Schindler, American architect
Rudolph Moshammer, German fashion designer
Rudolf Molleker, German tennis player
Roudolphe Douala, Cameroonian retired footballer
Rudolf Wittkower, American art historian 
Rudolph Koenig, German physicist
Rudolf Geiger, German meteorologist and climatologist
Rudolf Tombo Jr. (1875–1914), American philologist
Rudolf Ziegler, German rowing coxswain
Rudolph Nickolsburger, Hungarian footballer
Rudolf "Rudi" Gernreich, American fashion designer
Rudolf Holzapfel, Polish-born Austrian psychologist and philosopher
Rudolph Fentz, focal character of "I'm Scared", a 1952 science fiction short story by Jack Finney, which was later reported as a real person in an urban legend
Rudolph "Rudy" Hatfield, American-Filipino retired professional basketball player
Rudulph Evans, sculptor from Washington, D.C., who grew up in Virginia
Rudolph Emmerich, German bacteriologist noted for his advances against cholera and his co-invention of the first antibiotic drug Pyocyanase with Oscar Löw
Rudolf von Alt, Austrian landscape and architectural painter
Rudolph "Rudy" Sikich, American National Football League player
Rudolf Otto, German Lutheran theologian, philosopher, and comparative religionist
Rudolph Edward Torrini, American artist best known for his sculptures, wood carvings and bronze public monuments in the St. Louis area, including "The Immigrants", "The Union Soldier," and "Martin Luther King"
Rudolf "Rudi" Skácel, Czech footballer
Rudolf Steiner, Austrian philosopher, social reformer, architect and esotericist
Rudolph Fisher, African-American physician, radiologist, novelist, short story writer, dramatist, musician, and orator
Rudolph "Rudy" Johnson, former American football player who played for San Francisco 49ers and Atlanta Falcons of the National Football League (NFL)
Rudolf Wanderone, American professional billiards player, also known as "Minnesota Fats"
Rudolph A. Peterson, American banker who served as the President and CEO of Bank of America and Administrator of the United Nations Development Programme
Rodolfo Walsh, Argentine writer and journalist of Irish descent, considered the founder of investigative journalism, known for his Open Letter from a Writer to the Military Junta
Rodolphe Lemieux, Canadian parliamentarian and long time Speaker of the House of Commons of Canada
Rudolf Pleil, German serial killer
Rudolf Spielmann (1883–1942), Austrian-Jewish chess player
Rudolf Straeuli (born 1963), South African rugby player and coach
Rudolf Völler (born 1960), German football player
Rudolf Vrba (1924–2006), Slovak-Canadian professor of pharmacology and Jewish escapee of the Auschwitz concentration camp
Rudolf Poch, Austrian doctor, anthropologist, and ethnologist
Rudolph "Rudy" LaRusso (1927–2004), American basketball player
Rudolph Arvid Peterson (1904–2003), former president and CEO of Bank of America
Rudolf Zistler, Austro-Hungarian socialist and lawyer
Preston Rudolph "Rudy" York, American Major League Baseball player
Rudolph Wurlitzer (1831–1914) German American businessman, founder of The Rudolph Wurlitzer Company
:de:Rudolf Wacker, Austrian painter
Rudolf Zwirner (born 1933), German art dealer
Rudolf Koch (1876–1934), German type designer
Rodolfo "Rudy" Fernández y Farrés, Spanish basketball player
Rudolph Gerhardus Snyman, South African rugby union player

Fictional
Rudolph the Red-Nosed Reindeer, fictional character created by Robert L. May in 1939
Rudolf, a character from 2016 animated film Rudolf the Black Cat
Rudolf, Emperor of Rigel in the game Fire Emblem
Rudolph "Lightning" Jackson, a character from Total Drama: Revenge of the Island
Rudolph "Rudy" Holiday, a character in the 2018 role-playing video game Deltarune
Rudolph "Regular Sized Rudy" Stieblitz, a character in the animated television series Bob's Burgers

Surname

Athletes 
Ernie Rudolph (1909–2003), American baseball pitcher
Gergely Rudolf (born 1985), Hungarian football player
Jack Rudolph (American football) (1938–2019), American football player
Jacques Rudolph (born 1981), South African cricketer 
Kyle Rudolph (born 1989), American football player
Mason Rudolph (American football) (born 1995), American football player
Mason Rudolph (golfer) (1934–2011), American golfer
Nils Rudolph (born 1965), German freestyle swimmer
Travis Rudolph (born 1995), American football player
Wilma Rudolph (1940–1994), American Olympic athlete

In film and television 
Alan Rudolph (born 1943), American film director and screenwriter
Maya Rudolph (born 1972), American actress and comedian
William Rudolph (died 1975), American film technician

In science and technology 
Arthur Rudolph (1906–1996), German rocket scientist who helped develop the V-2 and the Saturn V
Emanuel David Rudolph (1927–1992), American botanist, lichenologist, and historian of botany

In music 
Jean-Joseph Rodolphe (1730–1812), French horn player, violinist and composer.
Max Rudolf (conductor) (1902–1995), German conductor who spent most of his career in the United States
Kevin Rudolf (born 1983), American musician, singer-songwriter and music producer

Other 
Albert Rudolph, birth name of Swami Rudrananda, American entrepreneur and spiritual teacher
Eric Rudolph (born 1966), American serial murderer and terrorist
Julia Ann Rudolph (c. 1820–c. 1890), American photographer
Paul Rudolph (architect) (1918–1997), American architect
Vernon Rudolph (1915–1973), American businessman, founder of Krispy Kreme Doughnuts, Inc

Names with a similar meaning
The name's first element, *Hrōþi, can also be found in:
Robert, Roger, Roland, Roderick, Roman, Rose, Rodney 
Other names also meaning "fame", "glory", "praise", "honour":
 Stephen / Steven
 Louis / Lewis / Ludwig
 Raymond 
 Tim / Timothy
 Michael
 Sonny
 Lothar
 Waldemar/Vladimir
 Morgan
 Neil / Niles / Nolan
 Gustav
 Justin 
 Joseph
 Ahmed / Hamid / Muhammad 
 Ottomar / Othmar / Omar

See also 
Rudy, nickname for Rudolph
Ralph, nickname for Rudolph
Raul/Raoul
Rolf
Rodolfo
Roderick
Roger 
Roland 
Robert
Ludolf
Ludolph

External links 
Statistics for name Rudolf in the Netherlands

German masculine given names
Dutch masculine given names
Norwegian masculine given names
Swedish masculine given names
Danish masculine given names
Icelandic masculine given names
Czech masculine given names
Slovak masculine given names
Croatian masculine given names
Slovene masculine given names
English masculine given names
Surnames from given names